
The Don Republic (later known as the Almighty Don Host, or , Vsevelikoye Voysko Donskoye) was an independent self-proclaimed anti-Bolshevik republic formed by the Armed Forces of South Russia on the territory of Don Cossacks against another self-proclaimed Don Soviet Republic. The Don Republic existed during the Russian Civil War after the collapse of the Russian Empire from 1918 to 1920.

In April 1918, after the liberation of Novocherkassk from control of the Don Soviet Republic, a Don Provisional Government was formed under G. P. Ianov. On 11 May, the "krug for the Salvation of the Don" opened, which organized the anti-Bolshevik war. On 16 May, Pyotr Krasnov was elected Ataman. On 17 May, Krasnov presented his "Basic Laws of The All Great Don voisko." Its 50 points included the inviolability of private property and abolished all laws promulgated since the abdication of Nicholas II. Krasnov also encouraged nationalism. According to Peter Kenez, "This new preoccupation with the glories of the past allowed the Cossacks to regard the struggle against their enemies as a war of national liberation, not merely one for defending their private interests against their fellow citizens."

The Don Republic claimed the territory of the Don region with the city of Novocherkassk as its capital. Administratively, the Don Republic was divided into ten okrugs, covering an area located in the Rostov and Volgograd Oblasts of RSFSR and in the Lugansk and Donetsk Oblasts of the neighboring Donetsk–Krivoy Rog Soviet Republic.

According to Peter Kenez, "Krasnov named Semenov, one of the army officers, 'governor' of Voronezh province (the part that had been liberated) and Colonel Manakin 'governor' of Saratov province."

The Don Republic ceased to exist after the Don Cossacks, who formed an essential part of the White Army, were defeated by the Red Army in the Russian Civil War. Many of the Russian Cossacks on Don were subjected to the Decossackization in 1919–1921, during the Soviet famine of 1932–33 and because of the repatriation of Cossacks after the Second World War by the United Kingdom to the Soviet Union, resulting in the eventual disappearance of the Don Cossacks' movement of resistance to the Soviet Union.

Gallery

See also 
 Don Army
 Don Host Oblast
 South Russia (1919–1920)
 Armed Forces of South Russia 
 Kuban People's Republic, a government formed by the Kuban Cossacks in 1918
 Ukrainian People's Republic
 Post-Russian Empire states

References

External links
 Footages of Don Republic (1918)

History of the Don Cossacks
Former republics
Post–Russian Empire states
White movement
States and territories established in 1918
States and territories disestablished in 1920
Former countries of the interwar period